The National Association of Marine Surveyors Inc. (NAMS) is a Houston, TX based not-for-profit educational association that aims to advance the marine surveying profession by certifying anyone with 5 years surveying experience and by providing them opportunities to enhance knowledge through ongoing professional education.  They act as a standard-bearing organization in that their members are required to pass an open book exam on surveying fundamentals.

Primarily, they approach their aim by awarding top marine surveyors, those who complete a rigorous induction process, with the title of Certified Marine Surveyor (NAMS-CMS).  But they also provide lifelong continuing education through annual and semi-annual meetings and workshops held in some of the world’s biggest seaports and maritime hubs.  Finally, they engage in educational efforts whose scope extends beyond their membership into the industry at-large.

History
NAMS was formed in 1962 as the culmination of a 14-year process that began when the Underwriters Laboratories Marine Dept (Yacht Safety Bureau, as it was known at the time), convened a body of independent expert surveyors to conduct equipment-review and consult with the YSB.  The group remained in existence until YSB’s reorganization in 1960.  During that time, a reputation for professionalism and competence accrued to them, and, in the year following the restructuring of the YSB, the group continued to convene.  A formal committee for oversight was formed and nearly a year later, the National Association of Marine Surveyors was formally convened.  Since then, it has garnered a reputation for industry acumen that has even resulted in its members being solicited as expert witnesses.  In 1980, the NAMS-Certified Marine Surveyor (CMS) indication was presented, which allows a surveyor to consult as an official representative of the association.  NAMS has expanded since that time to an international membership with members in Puerto Rico, the Caribbean Islands, Canada, Europe, South America, the Middle East, and Asia.

Certification
NAMS certified surveyors are considered to be as highly qualified within their specific area as anyone else in the industry.  They are fit to serve as consultants, special project directors, and educators.  The amount of knowledge and experience required to become a NAMS-CMS in part explains their slow numeric growth over the last 45 years.  The certification process begins when a member has “served as [a] professional marine [surveyor] for not less than five years,”  although provisions are made for those with less surveying experience when it is coupled with extensive industry experience in other capacities.  Candidates for certification are then screened by NAMS governing bodies for professional ethics and reputation.  Finally, they are examined for high competence in the portion of the industry they represent.  NAMS surveyors work in one or more of three general disciplines:  Hull and Machinery (commercial and large vessels), Yacht and Small Craft (which includes vessels of up to 300 feet in length), and Cargo.  Surveyors often specialize further within these three categories, subdividing into NAMS Codes of Service.  Demonstration of mastery over a NAMS Code of Service is the last step in the certification process.  Once certified, NAMS Surveyors are required to earn 6 continuing education credit hours every year.  Once certified, NAMS members are not to consult in areas in which they are not certified to work, but are not required to have errors and emissions insurance to protect their clients.

Continuing Education
One of NAMS’ goals is the continuing education of marine surveyors worldwide, and, once a surveyor has obtained the CMS certification, they are required to do 24 hours of continuing education per two year period in order to maintain their status.  NAMS holds national meetings, a large annual convention, and other, smaller gatherings all over the country and conducts continuing education seminars concurrently with those events in order not only to update its members’ knowledge base but also to commend that knowledge to the industry as a whole.  One of NAMS’ long-term goals is the enhancement of the industry through coordinated “free exchange of information”   with all interested parties.  As it is not a trade organization (i.e. not formed for the particular advancement of its own members) but rather an agent for improvement throughout the industry, it is not hindered by any consideration in its dissemination of an updated knowledge base; it is for this reason that the expertise of NAMS members is so highly regarded.  Its educational focus has made it a welcomed part of the entire industry.

Ethics
Marine surveyors, as standard-setters and evaluators of value and functionality of marine vessels and cargo are in a position of trust with government, the rest of the industry, and with their clients.  As a result, the industry levels strict ethical standards on surveyors.  NAMS’ own ethical code is even more stringent.  NAMS’ ethical stance can basically be understood as bifocal:  firstly, they aim to ensure that no NAMS surveyor consults outside of his/her specialty, and secondly, that within their specialty, no consideration prompts them to take a position against their professional judgment, as is stated in their credo:  “No surveyor shall take any position contrary to his or her own knowledge or opinion for any direct or indirect monetary gain or its equivalent.”   In both ways, ethical standards are intended to ensure reliability and objectivity on the part of surveyors, from whom utmost professionalism is demanded in all “dealings with clients, associates, and fellow members.”   The Code of Ethics outlines general best-practice principles for surveyors, professional conduct standards, and protocol for investigation in the event of an accusation.  In this way, it is hoped, ethical business can become the norm for all surveyors in accordance with the goal stated within the code:  “the enhancement of the marine industry and the marine surveying profession.”

Current Oversight
The national officers are President, Vice President, National Secretary, Treasurer, and Immediate Past President (see NAMS website for current officeholders).  A staff of Regional Vice Presidents assists executive leadership, and several chaired committees function within the leadership for the purposes of monitoring and overseeing special purposes within the association (e.g. ethics, insurance, certifications).  Additionally, there are directors presiding over every major marine region and many of the most important port cities in the world.

Notes

References
NAMS-CMS Website
Terewilliger, E.S.; "Product Safety: The Story of the Yacht Safety Bureau"'  as told to Art Stout, The Boating Industry, July 1962

Further reading
Marine Surveyor
Yacht Safety Board
The Institute of International Marine Survey website 

Marine occupations